Michael McGlone (born August 10, 1972, in White Plains, New York) is an American actor, singer, songwriter, and comedian. He is perhaps best known as the film noiresque spokesman for GEICO insurance posing rhetorical questions in the vein of Robert Stack or Rod Serling, which are then acted out in humorous fashion.

McGlone's best-known movie credits include two castings as writer/actor/director/producer Edward Burns's brother in the 1995 movie The Brothers McMullen and 1996's She's the One with Jennifer Aniston. He's also had large supporting roles in One Tough Cop and The Bone Collector.

On TV, McGlone's credits include Crash on the Starz and The Kill Point on Spike TV, as well as a recurring role on CBS's very well received Person of Interest. He also guest starred in an episode of Psych.Voice-over credits include The Learning Channel's Trauma: Life in the E.R., Court TV's I, Detective, and History series Dead Reckoning.  McGlone has also acted on stage. His writing credits include the novels CAL, ″And All the Roses Dying...″, Dice, Hourigan's Song and THE SOFT DRIVE. He has recorded and produced four albums, Hero (1999) and To Be Down (2002), SPEED (2016) and The Center EP (2017), as well as various singles, including "The Other Side", "The Hammer" and "Thank you again...".

Filmography

Film

Television

References

External links
 
 
 
 1995 New York Times interview (subscription required)

1972 births
American male actors
Living people
American people of Irish descent